NMBS/SNCB Class AM35 (Automotrice 35 French for Electric Multiple Unit (EMU) – 1935 [after their year of construction] - in Dutch they were MS35, the MS standing for MotorStel) were electric multiple unit trains operated by the National Railway Company of Belgium (NMBS/SNCB).  First used in service on May 5, 1935 (a century to the day after the founding of the Belgian Railways) along the first electric line between Brussels and Antwerp.

Twelve Electric Multiple Units consisting of four carriages set ran at 120 kilometres per hour between the two cities.

Technical Details
The EMUs consisted of two motorized cars at the ends and two infill trailers. Two manufacturers were selected for the power cars: 12 were built by the Société Anonyme la Métallurgique (Nivelles) and fitted with ACEC electrical equipment, the other 12 were assembled by the Ateliers de la Dyle (Leuven) and equipped by SEM (Société d'Électricité et de Mécanique).

The units were delivered in “blue and beige livery, fluid lines and detailed finishing” and proved quite popular with the travelling public. They featured an interior design by Belgian architect and designer Henry van de Velde, who was then artistic advisor for the Belgian National Railways. After World War Two, they were repainted in two tones of green, with large yellow visibility bands added shortly thereafter.

In 1939, 16 additional trailers were built in order to increase capacity during peak hours, creating 8 six-car sets. These new unpowered carriages were uncoupled and parked aside during low ridership hours.

History

The units were designed within the framework of the Universal Exhibition in Brussels in 1935, conceived as a chic and modern way to link Brussels and Antwerp. They were Belgium's first electric units. The AM35 EMU's were withdrawn from passenger service between 1959 and 1962 due to the heavy wear and tear they inflicted on the rails; several power cars were refurbished into mail trains for the Belgian postal service in 1967–1968. These mail trains were withdrawn in 1988.

Preservation
A four car set was kept in working order by Belgian State Railways; the leading car was later put on display at Train World while postal unit 002 is in private hands.

Most of the trailers were converted into service vehicles (measuring coaches, cinema car and track worker accommodation). The cinema coach is preserved in Maldegem and some mobile track worker “camp cars” are still in use.

References 

SNCB multiple units
Electric multiple units of Belgium
3000 V DC multiple units